Pelissero is an Italian surname. Notable people with the surname include:

Claudio Pelissero (born 1968), Italian music composer and producer
Harry Pelissero (born 1952), Canadian politician
John Peter Pelissero (born 1953), American political scientist

Italian-language surnames